Dick Packer was a U.S. soccer center forward who was a member of the U.S. team at the 1956 Summer Olympics.  He was a two time First Team All American at Penn State and played over ten seasons in the American Soccer League.

Biography
Packer grew up in Newtown, Bucks County, Pennsylvania.  He attended the George School where he played soccer, basketball and baseball.  In 1952, the Penn State University soccer coach, Bill Jeffrey, recruited Packer.  He entered Penn State on a full athletic scholarship, playing both baseball, as a center fielder and shortstop, as well as center forward on the soccer team.  At the time, collegiate rules prohibited freshmen from playing intercollegiate sports.  Consequently, he played on the varsity soccer team from 1953 to 1955.  His junior season, he dropped baseball and concentrated on soccer for his last two seasons at Penn State.  In 1954, Penn State won the national college championship and shared the 1955 title with Brockport University.  Packer was named to the 1954 and 1955 first team All American team.  Despite playing only three seasons and twenty-four games, he scored 53 goals, a school record which stood until broken by Stuart Reid in 1995.

In December 1955, he joined the Uhrik Truckers of the American Soccer League.  By that time, he had been selected for the U.S. Olympic Soccer team as it prepared for the 1956 Summer Olympics.  In order to maintain his amateur, he played without pay with Truckers.  The Truckers won the 1955-1956 ASL championship with Packer coming off the bench and scoring two goals in the title game.  Packer graduated from Penn State in 1956 with a bachelor's degree in hotel administration.  That summer, he went to the Summer Olympics, but did not play in the team's only game, a 9–1 loss to Yugoslavia.

During his college years, he had attended ROTC and after graduation, he was commissioned as a second lieutenant in the Air Force.  Packer separated from the Air Force in 1959.  He rejoined Uhrik and would play with the team until at least 1968.  He also worked in the travel industry.  He has also run soccer camps for over thirty years.

See also
List of Pennsylvania State University Olympians

References

External links
An unlikely Olympian

Living people
American soccer coaches
American soccer players
Olympic soccer players of the United States
Footballers at the 1956 Summer Olympics
Penn State Nittany Lions men's soccer players
American Soccer League (1933–1983) players
Uhrik Truckers players
United States Air Force officers
Soccer players from Pennsylvania
Year of birth missing (living people)
Association football forwards